ㅒ (yae) is one of the Korean hangul. The Unicode for ㅒ is U+3152. This vowel is ㅑ + ㅣ combined. When pronounced, ㅒ sounds like the ‘ye‘ in yes and yesterday.

Stroke order

References

Hangul jamo
Vowel letters